Overtures of Blasphemy is the twelfth studio album by American death metal band Deicide. It was released on September 14, 2018, through Century Media Records.

The cover artwork was created by Zbigniew M. Bielak, who has also worked with Ghost, Paradise Lost, and Mayhem. This is the band's first album since In the Minds of Evil (2013), and it is the only record to feature guitarist Mark English of Monstrosity, who replaced Jack Owen in 2016.

Reception

The album received mixed to positive reviews. Metal Injection said that "the album definitely belongs in the top half of Deicide's discography", Decibel said that "by track four, it has already muscled its way into the upper echelons of the band’s storied discography", but Exclaim! writer Joe Smith-Engelhardt called the album a "sore spot" in Deicide's career.

Track listing

Personnel
 Glen Benton – bass, vocals
 Steve Asheim – drums, additional guitars
 Kevin Quirion – guitars
 Mark English – guitars

Charts

References

2018 albums
Deicide (band) albums
Century Media Records albums
Albums produced by Jason Suecof